Araquistáin is a Spanish surname of Basque origin. People bearing this surname include:
 José Araquistáin (born 1937), Spanish footballer
 José María Araquistain (born 1948), Spanish footballer
 Luis Araquistáin (1886–1959), Spanish politician and writer